Acronychia acidula, commonly known as lemon aspen or lemon wood, is a species of small to medium-sized rainforest tree that is endemic to Queensland. It has simple, elliptical leaves, small groups of flowers in leaf axils and more or less spherical fruit.  The aromatic and acidic fruit is harvested as a bushfood.

Description
The crushed leaves often have an odour resembling that of mango (Mangifera indica). The eight stamens alternate in length.

Taxonomy
Acronychia acidula was first formally described in 1864 by Victorian state botanist Ferdinand von Mueller in Fragmenta phytographiae Australiae from specimens collected by John Dallachy in the Seaview Range near Rockingham Bay. Its species name acidula is Latin "slightly acid".

Distribution and habitat

Ecology
The fruit are eaten by the topknot pigeon (Lopholaimus antarcticus).

Uses
Lemon aspen fruit has a grapefruit and lime-like flavor, and is popular in beverages, sauces and confectionery. The fruit has high antioxidant activity.

Cultivation
The tree is grown in small-scale commercial bushfood orchards on the east coast of Australia from North Queensland to northern New South Wales. The tree is quick-growing and requires regular pruning to maintain a practical harvesting height. It has a moderate crop yield, and bears in four years from seedlings. It prefers well-drained and fertile clay loam soils, with a sunny aspect and extra moisture when young.

Cultural references
Lemon aspen featured on an Australian postage stamp in 2019.

References

acidula
Flora of Queensland
Trees of Australia
Plants described in 1864
Taxa named by Ferdinand von Mueller